Jeanne Bonaparte (15 September 1861 – 25 July 1910) was a great-niece of Napoleon I of France, and the only daughter of Pierre Napoleon Bonaparte by his wife Éléonore-Justine Ruflin. She was well known in French society as an artist and sculptor, and was married to Christian de Villeneuve-Esclapon.

Biography

Early life

Jeanne was born on 15 September 1861 in Orval Abbey, Belgium. She was one of five children born to her parents, but only one of two who survived to adulthood. Her brother being Roland Bonaparte. She was born during the reign of Napoleon III of France, but her family was never well received at the French imperial court as her grandfather Lucien Bonaparte displeased his brother Napoleon I with his choice of wife and was concequently disinherited. Her own father too being disinherited over his own choice of wife. Among French society, she was known for her paintings and sculptures.

After the fall of the Second French Empire in 1870, Jeanne, like all other Bonapartes, were sent into exile. She and her family moved to Brussels and then to London, where her father died shortly after.

As children, Jeanne and Roland received a first-class education. While they were in London, a former French officer whose father had served under Napoleon I took pity on the family and made arrangements for Roland to return to France and attend a military school. He also helped Jeanne by sending her to an art school in Paris. Jeanne took courses in painting and engraving. In the art school where she studied, she befriended the prosperous Monegasque heiress, Marie-Félix Blanc. Jeanne would later introduce Roland to Marie, who later marry. This greatly benefited the family's financial situation as Marie and her brother each gave Jeanne a million francs, after which she received many proposals, but her family encouraged her to marry for love.

Marriage 
She married Christian de Villeneuve-Escacalpon, the deputy of Corsica on 21 March 1882.

One observer commented at their wedding:

"Jeanne Bonaparte advanced up the nave leaning on the arm of her brother... She has little of her mother's striking beauty, although she resembles her a good deal, but she is tall, distinguished looking, and has a wealth of raven tresses..."

Jeanne and Christian had six children:

 Jules Pierre Napoléon de Villeneuve-Esclapon (1886–1957). He married Cécile Ernestine Marie de Courtois (1896–1981).
 Henriette Marie Jeanne de Villeneuve-Esclapon (1887–1942). She married Lucien Leret d'Aubigny (1876–1945).
 Romée Napoléon de Villeneuve-Esclapon (1889–1944).
 Lucien Louis Napoléon de Villeneuve-Esclapon (1890–1939). He married Iskouhi-Gladys Matossian (1894–1951).
 Marie Roselyne de Villeneuve-Esclapon (1893–1973). She married Bruno de Maigret (1888–1966).
 Rolande Anne Mathilde de Villeneuve-Esclapon (1896–1972). She married Antoine de Lyée de Belleau (1898–1978).

Later life
Jeanne had a Paris salon that was frequented by illustrious writers and painters, as well as the cream of American society. Her husband was, apart from politics, mostly interested in occultism. George Greville Moore, an English officer, was a contemporary of Jeanne's. He wrote that she:
"Used to make a great display of toilette at certain balls. She was remarkable for her beauty, which was more of the Oriental style; she was very dark and had a sallow complexion, but beautiful black eyes and long eyelashes. I remember one evening every one crowding around the staircase to see her arrive at a ball. On that occasion she wore a white dress trimmed with water-lilies, with a tremendously long train, and no jewelry whatsoever. She rarely, if ever, danced; her long train scarcely allowed it."

On 21 November 1907, Jeanne served as a witness for the marriage of her niece Princess Marie Bonaparte to Prince George of Greece and Denmark.

Jeanne died on 25 July 1910 in Paris, at the age of 48, predeceasing her husband by three years.

Ancestry

References

External links
 

1861 births
1910 deaths
Jeanne
Jeanne
French women painters
19th-century French painters
20th-century French painters
20th-century French sculptors
19th-century French sculptors
19th-century French women artists
20th-century French women artists